The Pure Pwnage web series and TV series feature many of the same characters and actors, but there are also notable differences in the cast and the characters' experiences.

Web series 
 Jeremy (aka teh_pwnerer) – Jeremy (played by Jarett Cale) is 26 years old and is a stereotypical gamer. He lives in Toronto, Ontario, Canada with his younger brother, Kyle. Jeremy spends the vast majority of his time playing video games and "pwning n00bs", using the online handle teh_pwnerer. He has been playing games since the age of two, when he used to "toaly pwn Pong".

Due to Jeremy's profound immersion in video game culture, his social skills have atrophied. Because Jeremy has lived in his basement for most of his life, he has had very little conversation with any other person and has therefore taught himself how to speak. His accent is slurred, full of interjections such as "like" and "'n' stuff," and employs Leetspeak. However, he has also developed the ability to quickly master any video game, and can play competitively against extremely skilled opponents. Jeremy often makes narcissistic comments about himself.

 Kyle – Kyle (played by Geoff Lapaire) is Jeremy's younger brother and the director of the show. He determines what events to film, but usually just follows Jeremy around. Occasionally, he tries to introduce Jeremy to a diversion from video gaming. According to Jeremy, Kyle is a "total n00b" in many ways. Kyle is also made fun of by Jeremy for only having a single testicle when he is really normal.

The show is shot almost entirely from Kyle's point of view and he often talks to the other characters. There are some instances where Kyle is caught on camera. In Episode 2 ("Girls"), when Jeremy is talking about the one time he pwned, the mirror behind him gives a presumably accidental glimpse of Kyle filming. In addition, Episode 9 ("The Story of Dave"), gives a third person shot of Kyle filming when the group is ambushed, but his face is hidden behind the camera as usual. His face is finally revealed in Episode 12 ("Game Over").

In Episode 18 ("Just the Guys Pt. 2"), it is revealed that Kyle is also involved with producing pornography.

  (aka fps_doug) – Doug (played by Joel Gardiner) is Jeremy's boisterous best friend and rival. Doug spends most of his time playing FPS games such as Counter-Strike: Source, America's Army, and Call of Duty 4: Modern Warfare, and defeating his opponents by skillfully "getting the headshot". According to Doug, his skills frequently get him banned from servers due to accusations of him hacking. Doug has serious anger management issues, and can appear to be a psychopath, obsessed with FPS games to the point that he goes out training and practicing headshots in real life with an imaginary gun and holding the belief that carrying a knife whilst running makes him go faster. This stems from the fact that in many FPS games, you move faster while carrying only the close range weapon. At the end of season 1, Doug gets mad at Jeremy because Jeremy feels he is getting too close. Later in episode 12 ("Game Over") Doug tries to kill Jeremy but is saved by Dave as later seen in Episode 13 ("Old Habits"). At the end of the first season, Doug betrays Jeremy for a conspiring, unidentified organization, but they reunite as friends during Jeremy's birthday party in Episode 16 ("Just the Guys Pt. 2") as they pwn together on Call of Duty 4.

Doug's triumphant catchphrase "Boom! Headshot!" has become a popular exclamation among FPS players and has appeared on many online message boards and chatrooms. The phrase is particularly popular in the online game Counter Strike: Source because that resulted in Doug saying it the most. "BOOM! Headshot!" is also featured in Call of Duty: Modern Warfare 2 as a callsign the player can set.

He is known to do many outrageous things like breaking his keyboard, and uncontrollable screaming when he dies in Counter-Strike. The most outrageous thing he did was after being rejected by Jeremy, while walking away and twitching, threw down his TV he was carrying which shattered.

 Dave (aka Dawei) – Dave (played by Dave Lee) is a friend of Jeremy's and is notable for his cooking skills and his nonchalant sense of humour, is first introduced as a crew member in a "behind the scenes" featurette at the end of Episode 3 ("FPS Doug"). He excels at fighting games such as Street Fighter II but is usually seen cooking or casually observing Jeremy and Kyle's antics. He started his own web cooking show, Pro at Cooking.

Dave left the show after Episode 9 ("The Story of Dave"), saying he had things to do back in China (he later returned in Episode 13, "Old Habits"). The web comic later revealed that he was really moving to Vancouver for a new job. However, the creators of Pure Pwnage have been known to be misleading, and the web comic could very well be a filler for those looking for an explanation on why Dave left the show. Hak5's documentary on Pure Pwnage implies that Dave simply didn't want to star in the show and requested to be written out in a positive way. Dave returned to the show in season 2, rescuing Jeremy from his "near pwned" experience against Doug and the Big Bad. He refused to say what happened in China but he resumes playing games and cooking for Jeremy and Kyle.

 Teh_Masterer – Teh_Masterer (voiced by William Leonard Craig and played by Geoff Lapaire) is always clad entirely in ninja clothing, and is a mysterious master gamer who trains Jeremy and others in the ways of being a pro gamer. His micro ability is so profound that he can play multiple video games at the same time, and he claims that he once "beat Garry Kasparov and Deep Blue with nothing more than a row of pawns and a single bishop." He lives in seclusion in a small apartment, but has access to a training area (Kyle refers to this as the "room with no exits"). In Episode 11 ("i <3 u in rl"), when Jeremy visits the Netherlands, Teh_Masterer appears to be under surveillance by some form of agency such as the CIA, who are tracking Teh_Masterer's network of gamers and apprentices. Whether this story arc will be picked up on or continued in the future is unknown. Teh_Masterer wears black ninja clothing to protect his exceptionally sensitive skin, a condition he developed from playing video games for fifteen straight years in a dim basement. In Episode 12 ("Game Over"), it is revealed that Geoff Lapaire plays both Kyle and Teh_Masterer.
 Anastasia – MMO-playing Anastasia (played by Miranda Plant) is Jeremy's first, but former love interest on Pure Pwnage. She interacts with Jeremy off-camera in Episode 2 ("Girls"), but the audience never sees her meet him until Episode 6 ("Imapwnu of Azeroth"). She plays World of Warcraft under the pseudonym "Tagi". In Episode 14 ("Lifestyles"), Jeremy decides to delete her character in World of Warcraft after it becomes apparent that Anastasia has become addicted to it. Anastasia and Jeremy have different views about video games, as she believes they should be social, not just about pwning noobs. In Episode 12 ("Game Over"), it is revealed that she has turned into a vegetarian because of the health benefits. In Episode 17 ("Just the Guys Pt. 1"), Jeremy sees Anastasia dancing with a guy, when she told him she was going for a "girl's night out." This ultimately leads to their break up.
 Terence Brown (aka T-Bag) – Terence (played by Troy Dixon) first appears in Episode 15 ("T-Bag"). An expert at the Halo series, quoted as making "$250,000 last year playing Halo".  He and Jeremy get off to a bad start at the release of Halo 3 as they wait in line, where it is shown that T-Bag is famous among Halo fans for his skills in the game. However, they meet again in the street and decide to start fresh. Jeremy is later invited to T-Bag's Halo 3 party, where he sees Doug. Doug and Jeremy then have a one on one match, and Jeremy eventually decides to leave because it appears he didn't feel comfortable arguing with Doug, his old friend.

Troy Dixon, who played T-Bag, died in a car crash on December 6, 2008. The Pure Pwnage cast is quoted as saying:

 Kris – In Episode 17 ("Just the Guys Pt. 1"), Dave is shown with a younger pupil who is a part of an exchange training program set up by Teh_Masterer. Kris is the young gamer that is assigned to Jeremy. Jeremy explains that Kris is the best of the younger gamers. In Episode 18 ("Just the Guys Pt. 2"), Jeremy talks about Kris with T-Bag when they are on his yacht. Jeremy implies that Kris is "a guy". However, at the very end of the episode, we are shown a brief clip of Kris, who turns out to be a teenage girl. The episode ends with Kris sitting in her desk chair while Jeremy stands open-mouthed at the shock of his pupil's unexpected gender and attractiveness.

TV series 
 Jeremy (aka teh_pwnerer) – Jeremy (played by Jarett Cale) is a fanatical gamer and lives in the basement of his mother's house in Toronto, Ontario, Canada. Jeremy spends the vast majority of his time playing video games at home or at the Mouse & Pad, an Internet café. At the beginning in the TV series, his mother forces him to get a job. He eventually lands a job at a grocery store after his quick hand–eye coordination is noticed by the store's manager.

 Kyle – Kyle (played by Geoff Lapaire) is Jeremy's brother and the director of the show. An aspiring film-maker, he decides to follow Jeremy around and film his life as a gamer. The show is shot almost entirely from Kyle's point of view, and he often talks to the other characters although always from behind the camera.

 Doug (aka fps_doug) – Doug (played by Joel Gardiner) is Jeremy's boisterous best friend. Doug spends most of his time playing FPS games such as Counter-Strike: Source, America's Army, and Call of Duty 4: Modern Warfare, and defeating his opponents by skillfully "getting the headshot". Doug often appears out of touch with reality; obsessed with FPS games to the point that he goes out training and practicing headshots in real life with an imaginary gun and holding the belief that carrying a knife whilst running makes him go faster. This belief causes Doug to end up accidentally mugging an old lady and getting arrested.  He subsequently gets banned from playing games for six weeks. Doug lives at home with his mother (who frequently kicks his father out of the house).  Doug's mother often gives Doug money to leave the house, so she can entertain different men.

 October – October (played by Melanie Scrofano) first appears in the premiere of the TV series. She is an employee of the Mouse & Pad, an internet café that Jeremy and Doug frequently visit. She is a World of Warcraft player. She seems to show an interest in Jeremy while blind to the fact that Kyle seems to have an interest in her.
 Tyrel – Tyrel (played by Eli Goree) first appears in the third episode of the TV series. He takes the role that T-Bag had in the original web series. He shares many traits with the former character: skilled at Halo, social skills, ease with girls. He is eager to help bring Jeremy out of his cocoon and into the real world.
 Simon – Simon (played by Simon Wong) is the owner of the Mouse & Pad internet cafe.  Simon is mostly concerned with making money and decides to stop letting Jeremy play games for free.  He notes that since hiring the attractive October, his customer base has increased significantly.

See also 
 List of Pure Pwnage episodes
 Web series
 Mockumentary

References

External links 
 
 Pure Pwnage web episodes
 Pure Pwnage episodes at Showcase.ca
 Pure Pwnage TV series on IMDB
 Pure Pwnage Artchive

Pure Pwnage